Eden Mills is an unincorporated village in the town of Eden, Lamoille County, Vermont, United States.

Federico García Lorca began Poet in New York and translated Songs while in Eden Mills, visiting his friend Philip Cummings, whose family had rented a summer cottage there in 1929.

References

Unincorporated communities in Lamoille County, Vermont
Unincorporated communities in Vermont